Baron Ashton of Hyde, of Hyde in the County of Chester, is a title in the Peerage of the United Kingdom. It was created on 28 June 1911 for the industrialist and Liberal politician Thomas Ashton. He had earlier represented Hyde and Luton in the House of Commons.

Since 2008, the title has been held by his great-grandson, the fourth Baron, who won a by-election to the House of Lords in July 2011 taking the Earl of Onslow's room. Ashton was appointed Chief Whip and Captain of the Honourable Corps of Gentlemen-at-Arms in July 2019.

Barons Ashton of Hyde (1911)
Thomas Gair Ashton, 1st Baron Ashton of Hyde (1855–1933)
Thomas Henry Raymond Ashton, 2nd Baron Ashton of Hyde (1901–1983)
Thomas John Ashton, 3rd Baron Ashton of Hyde (1926–2008)
Thomas Henry Ashton, 4th Baron Ashton of Hyde (b. 1958)

The heir presumptive is the present holder's brother John Edward Ashton (b. 1966).  At this time, there are no further heirs to the Barony.

See also
Baron Ashton

References

Baronies in the Peerage of the United Kingdom
Noble titles created in 1911
Noble titles created for UK MPs
Ashton family